Andrea Foglia Costa (born December 4, 1985) is a Uruguayan sports sailor. At the 2012 Summer Olympics, she competed in the Women's Laser Radial class, finishing in 38th place.

She won the Women's World Championship in the Snipe class twice (2004 and 2006).

Her brother is Alejandro Foglia, another Uruguayan sailor.

Results

Women's Snipe class
World Championships
2004: 1st
2006: 1st

Women's Laser Radial class
Pan American Games
2011: 9th
ISAF Sailing World Championships
2011: 69th
Olympic Games
2012: 38th

Notes

References

External links
 
 
 

1985 births
Living people
Catholic University of Uruguay alumni
Olympic sailors of Uruguay
Uruguayan female sailors (sport)
Pan American Games competitors for Uruguay
People from Montevideo
Sailors at the 2011 Pan American Games
Sailors at the 2012 Summer Olympics – Laser Radial
Snipe class female world champions
World champions in sailing for Uruguay